Bárbara Mujica is an American scholar, novelist, short story writer, and literary critic. She is an Emeritus Professor of Spanish at Georgetown University.

Early life and education
Mujica attended the University of California at Los Angeles for her undergraduate education, and studied French literature. She then attended Sorbonne University for graduate study in French, and completed her doctorate at New York University in Spanish literature, with Antonio Regalado as her dissertation advisor.

Career
Her writing career began with writing short stories, and she also taught Spanish literature. Mujica was on the board of directors for the Washington Review from 1994 through 1998.

In the late 1990s, Mujica developed a draft for what became the biographical novel Frida, based on the life of Frida Kahlo, which was first published in 2001 and has since been translated into 18 languages. In 2007, she published the historical novel Sister Teresa, about the woman who became Saint Teresa of Ávila, and the book was translated into Spanish in 2017. Her next novel, I am Venus, a fictional biography of the model for the La Venus del espejo painting by Diego Velázquez, was published in 2013. Her novel Miss del Rio, published in 2022, is about the life of the movie star Dolores del Río.

In 2019, an essay collection was published to honor her scholarly work, titled Women Warriors in Early Modern Spain: A Tribute to Bárbara Mujica.

Selected works

Fiction
The Deaths of Don Bernardo (1990, novel)
Sanchez across the Street and Other Stories (1997, short stories)
Far from My Mother's Home (1999, short stories)
Frida (2001, novel)
Sister Teresa (2007, novel)
I Am Venus (2013, novel)
Imagining Iraq (2021, short stories)
Miss del Río (2022, novel)

Nonfiction
Women Writers of Early Modern Spain: Sophia's Daughters (Yale University Press, 2004)
Espiritualidad y feminismo: Santa Teresa de Jesus (Ediciones del Orto, 2007)
Teresa de Avila, Lettered Women (Vanderbilt University Press, 2009)
Shakespeare and the Spanish Comedia (Bucknell University Press 2013)
A New Anthology of Early Modern Spanish Theater: Play and Playtext (Yale University Press 2014)
Women Religious and Epistolary Exchange in the Carmelite Reform: The Disciples of Teresa de Avila (2020).

References

External links 
 
 Georgetown University faculty profile

Living people
Place of birth missing (living people)
Year of birth missing (living people)
University of California alumni
New York University alumni
20th-century American novelists
21st-century American novelists
American women novelists
Georgetown University faculty
20th-century American women writers
21st-century American women writers
American women academics